Martina Klein Korin (born Buenos Aires, December 7, 1976) is a Spanish-Argentine model, TV presenter and comedian.

Early life 
Klein was born in Argentina. Her family moved to Barcelona when she was 12.

Career 
At age 15, Klein began her modeling career in Spain. Klein appeared in the fashion events: Milan Fashion Week, Paris Fashion Week, Cibeles Madrid Fashion Week, New York Fashion Week. She appeared in advertising campaigns for brands such as Yves Rocher, El Corte Inglés, Trident, Mango, Wella, Pronovias, Don Algodón and fashion magazines (Cosmopolitan, Elle and Marie Claire).

Personal life 
Klein had a relationship with Spanish singer Álex de la Nuez (1999-2008) with whom she had a son in 2005. Klein had a daughter with Spanish tennis player Àlex Corretja in 2017.

Filmography

Films 
 2002 Raíces de sangre
 2011 Red Eagle (original title Águila Roja: la película - as Beatriz.
 2015 Solo química

Videoclips
Si tú no vuelves, Miguel Bosé, 1998

TV
Les mil i una, 1998-1999
 Las Mañanas de Cuatro, 2006-2007
 Planeta Finito, 2007
 Celebritis, 2008
 El club del chiste, 2010-2011
 ADN MAX, 2015

References and external links

External links 

IMDB

1976 births
Living people
Argentine comedians
Argentine women comedians
Argentine television presenters
Argentine women television presenters
Argentine expatriates in Spain
Argentine female models
Spanish comedians
Spanish women comedians
Spanish female models
Spanish television presenters
Spanish women television presenters
21st-century Argentine women